Francis Joseph Parater (October 10, 1897 – February 7, 1920) was an American Catholic seminarian from the Diocese of Richmond in Virginia who died of rheumatic fever at the age of 22 during his theological studies in Rome. He was nominated for canonization, the process by which one is declared a saint, in 2001.

Life
Frank Parater was born on October 10, 1897 to a Catholic family in Richmond, Virginia, the son of Captain Francis J. Parater, Sr. and his second wife, Mary Richmond. While growing up, he served as an altar boy, and attended the Xaverian Brothers' School (subsequently called Saint Patrick's School) and Benedictine High School (subsequently called Benedictine College Preparatory) in Richmond. In 1917, he graduated as the valedictorian of his class. Parater was active in scouting, and achieved the rank of Eagle Scout.

Parater decided to pursue a vocation to the priesthood after high school and began college at Belmont Abbey Seminary in 1917. As a seminarian, he was noted for his dedication to prayer and his intellectual and physical abilities. In 1919, his bishop, Denis J. O'Connell, sent him to study theology at the Pontifical North American College in Rome. He officially began his studies there on November 25, 1919.

In January 1920, Parater became very ill with rheumatic fever. He received last rites and died on February 7. After his death, his "Act of Oblation," a sort of prayer and spiritual testament he had written, was discovered. Two popes have asked for copies of it, and it has been published in English and in the L'Osservatore Romano in Italian. His body is interred in the mausoleum of the North American College in Rome's Campo Verano cemetery.

Cause for canonization
The  of the Holy See to begin the cause for Frank Parater's canonization was granted on May 8, 2001. The bishop of Richmond at the time, Walter F. Sullivan, established the tribunal on March 24, 2002. The postulator of the cause is Rev. J. Scott Duarte, J.C.D.

See also
 List of American candidates for sainthood

References

1897 births
1920 deaths
American Servants of God
Pontifical North American College
20th-century venerated Christians
Religious leaders from Richmond, Virginia
Roman Catholic Diocese of Richmond
Religious leaders from Virginia
Catholics from Virginia